The Governor's Palace is the seat of the Pontifical Commission for Vatican City State. The palace is located in the Vatican Gardens behind St. Peter's Basilica.

History
The palace was formed by joining three adjacent buildings. It was built in the eclectic style between 1927 and 1931 by Giuseppe Momo Piedmont. The Church of Santa Maria Regina della Famiglia, also built by Piedmont is located within the palace complex. The palace suffered considerable damage during the Bombing of the Vatican during World War II.

Gallery

References 

Palaces in Rome
Palaces in Vatican City
Official residences in Vatican City